Hindi cinema, popularly known as Bollywood, consisting primarily of films in the Hindi language.

Global gross figures
The following table lists the top 15 highest-grossing Hindi films. The figures are not adjusted for inflation.

The following list of films is sorted in terms of Indian rupees. Currency conversions to US dollars are also given as reference points, as many of these films had international releases. However, the currency conversions may not be consistent, as the dollar-rupee exchange rate has varied over time, from 48 rupees per dollar in 2009 to over 65 rupees per dollar in 2017. The exchange  even more greatly prior to 2009, so a number of older films which grossed highly in terms of US dollars are under-represented on this list.

Domestic gross figures  

The following is a list of highest-grossing Hindi films in India. This is an official tracking of figures, as reliable sources that publish data are frequently pressured to increase their estimates. Box office collections have been steadily increasing in the 21st century, the main reasons attributed to the rise in ticket prices, and increase in number of theatres and prints of a film.

Nominal gross

Opening records 
 
The following is a list of biggest opening day records of Hindi films in India.

Opening day gross

Biggest worldwide opening weekend gross

Highest-grossing films by month

See also 
 List of highest-grossing Indian films
 List of highest-grossing South Indian films
 List of highest grossing films in India
 List of most expensive Indian films
 List of Hindi films

Notes

References 

Lists of highest-grossing films by region
Hindi cinema